Longci District, alternatively spelled Longqi. is a rural district of about 3,634 residents in Tainan, Taiwan.

History
After the handover of Taiwan from Japan to the Republic of China in 1945, Longci was organized as a rural township of Tainan County. On 25 December 2010, Tainan County was merged with Tainan City and Longci was upgraded to a district of the city.

Geography
Longci District borders Sinhua District and Zuojhen District to the north; Neimen District, Kaohsiung to the east; Guanmiao District to the west; and Tianliao District, Kaohsiung to the south.

Administrative divisions 
The district consists of Qiding, Tuqi, Zhongkeng, Nankeng, Niupu, Daping, Longchuan and Shicao Village.

Tourist attractions 
 Cingshuei Temple
 Husing Mountain Resort Park
 Nioupu Village
 Oolong Pond

References

External links 

 

Districts of Tainan